Headlines is the third album by Australian band Flash and the Pan, released in 1982. It includes the UK hit single "Waiting for a Train" which reached No. 7 in the charts in June 1983. At this time, Stevie Wright was officially a member of Flash and the Pan, making this version of the group close to an Easybeats revival; however, there is some doubt about how much Wright actually contributed to the recordings. He appears in the video to the song 'Where Were You' miming to George Young's voice.

Track listing

Personnel
 Harry Vanda - lead guitar, vocals
 George Young - lead vocals, keyboards, rhythm guitar
 Les Karski - bass
 Ray Arnott - drums, vocals
 Chrissie and Lyndsay Hammond - backing vocals
 Harry Vanda & George Young - producers
 Sam Horsburgh, Jr. - engineer
 Colin Freeman - mix-down engineer
 Björn Almstedt - mastering
 Paul Janiszewski - cover artwork/concept
 Stevie Wright - vocals

References 

1982 albums
Flash and the Pan albums
Albert Productions albums
Epic Records albums
Albums produced by Harry Vanda
Albums produced by George Young (rock musician)